Chu Fu (died 130 BC), was a Han dynasty occultist who was executed for witchcraft.
 
She is said to have tried to approach Empress Chen Jiao and teach her sorcery and love spells to get rid of a woman who was competing with Empress Chen for favor. When this plot was discovered, Chen Jiao's husband Emperor Wu of Han ordered the imperial censor Zhang Tang to investigate. Zhang Tang's investigation found more than three hundred people who were implicated and executed. Chu Fu was publicly beheaded and her head hung up on public display. On the 14th day of the 7th month (Chinese calendar) Emperor Wu deposed the empress, confiscated her imperial seal, removed her title, and banished her to the Changmen Palace (長門宮).

References 

2nd-century BC Chinese women
2nd-century BC Chinese people
People executed for witchcraft
130 BC deaths
Executed ancient people
Ancient occultists
Royal favourites
Witchcraft in China